Seán Óg Sheehy (born 24 May 1939) is an Irish former Gaelic footballer who played as a left wing-back at senior level for the Kerry county team.

Sheehy's brothers Niall and Paudie also played with Kerry while his father, John Joe Sheehy, also captained Kerry to All-Ireland glory.

Club
At club level Sheehy won five consecutive county club championship winners' medals with John Mitchels from 1959-63. He won a sixth title in 1966. He also played hurling with the club.

During his collage days he also won a Cork Senior Football Championship title with UCC in 1960.

Underage
Sheehy played both football and hurling with Kerry in the 1950s but had little success in either code.

Junior
Having lost his place on the Kerry senior team he joined the county's junior team. He won a Munster Junior Football Championship title in 1965 after overcoming Clare in the final.

Senior
Sheehy made his first appearance for the team during the 1962 championship where he captained the side. Wins over Waterford and Cork seen Sheehy lead his side to a Munster Senior Football Championship title. Kerry overcame Dublin in the All-Ireland semi-final to book a final place. In the final Kerry faced Roscommon in Croke Park. At full time Sheehy had followed in his father John Joe by leading Kerry to All-Ireland glory as captain alongside brothers Niall and Paudie.

In 1963 he played and was captain in the National Football League Home final win over Galway, but didn't play in the final win over New York.

During the 1963 championship wins over Tipperary and Cork seen Sheehy win his second Munster Senior Football Championship title. He lost his place in the starting 15 for the All-Ireland semi-final with Galway. He came on as a sub but it wasn't enough to prevent Kerry from losing. Despite being only 24 years old this was his last game with Kerry.

Honours

Club
John Mitchels
Kerry Senior Football Championship (6): 1959, 1960, 1961, 1962, 1963, 1966

UCC
Cork Senior Football Championship (1): 1960

County
Kerry
Munster Senior Football Championship (2): 1962 (C), 1963
All-Ireland Senior Football Championship (1): 1962 (C)
Munster Junior Football Championship (1): 1965

References

 

1939 births
Living people
Irish schoolteachers
John Mitchels (Kerry) Gaelic footballers
John Mitchels (Kerry) hurlers
Kerry inter-county Gaelic footballers
Munster inter-provincial Gaelic footballers
Seán Óg
Winners of one All-Ireland medal (Gaelic football)